The Save Darfur Coalition was an advocacy group that called "to raise public awareness and mobilize a massive response to the atrocities in Sudan's western region of Darfur." Headquartered in Washington, D.C., it was a coalition of more than 190 religious, political and human rights organizations designed to campaign for a response to the atrocities of the War in Darfur. The result has become a global humanitarian crisis. Today, reports indicate that the conflict has claimed approximately 300,000 lives as a result of ethnic cleansing, disease and starvation and has displaced over 2.5 million people.

The war began when two rebel groups, the Sudan Liberation Army (SLA) and the Justice and Equality Movement (JEM), attacked government installations in Darfur in response to the Khartoum government's increasing economic and political marginalization of the non-Arab population. The Sudanese government retaliated and recruited local Arab militias known as the Janjaweed ("devils on horseback") to systematically rape and murder all minority populations.

In 2011, in order to create a more effective and collective voice dedicated to preventing and eliminating genocidal violence, the Genocide Intervention Network and the Save Darfur Coalition merged to establish United to End Genocide. The merger created the largest anti-genocide campaign that encompasses a membership base of over 800,000 global activists, a mass student movement, and a network of institutional investors with over $700 billion in assets.

History

Founding
The Save Darfur Coalition was founded at the "Darfur Emergency Summit in New York City" on July 14, 2004. The Coalition began when the United States Holocaust Memorial Museum and American Jewish World Service organized this event at the CUNY Graduate Center in Manhattan featuring Holocaust survivor and Nobel Peace Prize-winner Elie Wiesel.

The coalition grew into an alliance of more than 180 religious, political, and human rights organizations committed to ending the alleged genocide in Darfur. Save Darfur was headquartered in Washington, D.C., with a staff of 30 professional organizers, policy advisors, and communications specialists.

The coalition's members initially signed on to the following unity statement:

"We stand together and unite our voices to raise public awareness and mobilize a massive response to the atrocities in Sudan's western region of Darfur. Responding to a rebellion in 2003, the regime of Sudanese President Omar al-Bashir and its allied militia, known as the Janjaweed, launched a campaign of destruction against the civilian population of ethnic groups identified with the rebels. They wiped out entire villages, destroyed food and water supplies, stole livestock, and systematically murdered, tortured, and raped civilians. The Sudanese government's genocidal, scorched earth campaign has claimed hundreds of thousands of lives through direct violence, disease, and starvation, and continues to destabilize the region. Millions have fled their homes and live in dangerous camps in Darfur, and hundreds of thousands are refugees in neighboring Chad. Violence continues today. Ultimately, the fate of the Darfuri people depends on establishing lasting and just peace in all of Sudan and in the region."

Dream for Darfur
As the official Olympic torch made its way around the world prior to the beginning of the 2008 Summer Olympics, the Olympic Dream for Darfur team, a campaign to bring mass attention to the conflict in Darfur, began its own symbolic relay. The Dream for Darfur team had one and only goal: to convince China that the continuation of the Olympic Games in Beijing was at risk unless it withdrew support for Sudan's regime. Eight genocide survivors joined the relay led by Mia Farrow and traveled to Rwanda, Armenia, Germany, Bosnia, Herzegovina and Cambodia.

This led to the formation of a U.S.-based relay in September 2007. Jill Savitt and Mia Farrow organized and led the event, supported by GI-Net, the Save Darfur Coalition and the Enough Project.

The mission of the Dream for Darfur team was to break down the foreign policy information into a digestible form, so that citizens, without the background to understand the complexities of the international policy-making process, could become involved in the anti-genocide campaign.

The Dream for Darfur team encouraged the major sponsors of the Olympic Games, such as McDonald's, Anheuser-Busch, Microsoft, and Volkswagen to privately meet with Chinese officials to raise concerns over affairs in Darfur. Eventually, the team encouraged Steven Spielberg to resign as creative consultant for the opening ceremonies.

Advocacy programs

STAND
STAND (formerly known as Students Taking Action Now: Darfur) was founded in 2004 by students at Georgetown University as the student-led division of United to End Genocide. STAND opposes violence in Burma, the Democratic Republic of the Congo, Sudan, South Sudan, and Syria. In April 2015, STAND merged with the Aegis Trust.

Million Voices for Darfur
On January 22, 2006, the 55th anniversary of the ratification of the U.N.'s Convention on Genocide, the Save Darfur Coalition launched the campaign, Million Voices for Darfur, which involved the collation of uniformly worded postcards from citizen advocates across the country. The postcards insisted that President Bush support "a stronger multinational force to protect the civilians of Darfur."

On June 29, 2006, just six months after the start of the campaign, Bill Frist, the Senate Majority Leader at the time, and Senator Hillary Clinton, signed the 1,000,000th and 1,000,001st postcards.

The Million Voices program was the first example of the Save Darfur Coalition's attempt to influence the executive branch of the U.S. government to enact change.

Divest for Darfur
In order to exert financial pressure on the government of Sudan to change its policies and bring peace to its people, Save Darfur launched a divestment campaign, Divest for Darfur. The campaign was similar to Genocide Intervention Network’s divestment project, The Sudan Divestment Task Force.

Divest for Darfur focused on using print and broadcast advertisements to target the "highest offending" companies that conducted business in Sudan, such as Fidelity Investments and Berkshire-Hathaway. Both companies heavily invested in PetroChina, whose revenue supported the Sudanese military and allowed them to continue committing crimes against humanity.

Divest for Darfur’s broadcast advertisements aired on CNN and were featured in such publications as The Hill, Roll Call and the Washington Times. Besides creating general ads encouraging companies to divest in Sudan, the Save Darfur Coalition also directly called on the United States Senate to pass the best version of the Sudan Accountability and Divestment Act as possible.

Save Darfur: Rally to Stop Genocide
On April 30, 2006, the Save Darfur Coalition organized the "Save Darfur: Rally to Stop Genocide" to occur on the National Mall in Washington, D.C., and encouraged other national communities to hold rallies of their own. Over 50,000 people gathered among prominent speakers, such as Barack Obama, Elie Wiesel, Nancy Pelosi, George Clooney, Paul Rusesabagina, and Brian Steidle, to demand withdrawal of any objection to a UN peacekeeping force, better humanitarian access to refugees, adhesion to existing treaties and ceasefire agreements and a commitment to a lasting peace agreement in the Abuja peace talks.

Tour for Darfur – Eyewitness to Genocide
Brian Steidle, former Marine Captain and observer to the African Union peacekeeping forces stationed in the Darfur region, toured the United States in 2006 to be the voice for the voiceless in Darfur. Through words and pictures, he expressed the importance of addressing the security and humanitarian needs in Darfur and guided Americans how to become involved. The tour covered 21,000 miles and 20 different locations. It continued to promote the messages of other campaigns of the Save Darfur Coalition, such as the Million Voices for Darfur and the Save Darfur: Rally to Stop Genocide.

1-800-GENOCIDE
1-800-GENOCIDE was a toll-free number that allowed individuals to voice their concerns about genocides and mass atrocities to their elected public officials. To date, over 25,000 calls have been made.

DarfurScores.org
DarfurScores.org was a unique scorecard grading system that allowed individuals to learn how the United States Congress and their respective representatives have, or haven't, addressed problems in Darfur. DarfurScores.org made affairs in Darfur more transparent and was the model for scorecards for several other countries. Concerned constituents, by learning their representatives’ stance on genocidal issues, were not only able to place more direct pressure on governmental officials to inspire change, but societal members were also able to hold policy-makers accountable for their actions.

Endorsers/partners
The Save Darfur Coalition had over 190 national and regional organizational supporters including Amnesty International, Genocide Intervention Network, NAACP, United to End Genocide and Physicians for Human Rights.

See also
 Darfur conflict
 History of Darfur
 Sudan
 Genocide

References

External links
 History.com website
 GI-Net Annual Report
 NY Times

Advocacy groups in the United States
War in Darfur